The 1935–36 Boston Bruins season was the Bruins' 12th season in the NHL.

Regular season

Final standings

Record vs. opponents

Schedule and results

Playoffs
The Boston Bruins lost the Quarter-Finals to the Toronto Maple Leafs 8 goals to 6 goals in a two-game total goal series.

Player statistics

Regular season
Scoring

Goaltending

Playoffs
Scoring

Goaltending

See also
1935–36 NHL season

References

Boston Bruins seasons
Boston
Boston
Boston Bruins
Boston Bruins
1930s in Boston